Cocke County High School is a public high school located in Newport, Tennessee. The school serves around 1,100 students in a predominantly rural area of East Tennessee. It serves all of Cocke County except the southern portion, which is served by Cosby High School.

Feeder Schools
 Newport Grammar
 Bridgeport Elementary
 Northwest Elementary
 Centerview Elementary
 Parrottsville Elementary
 Del Rio Elementary
 Edgemont Elementary

References

Cocke County High School Web Site

Schools in Cocke County, Tennessee
Public high schools in Tennessee
1917 establishments in Tennessee
Newport, Tennessee